Akō Rōshi refers to the forty-seven rōnin.

Akō Rōshi may also refer to:

 Akō Rōshi: Ten no Maki, Chi no Maki, a 1956 Japanese film
 Akō Rōshi (1961 film), a Japanese film
 Akō Rōshi (1964 TV series), a Japanese television series.
 Akō Rōshi (1979 TV series), a Japanese television period drama